The 2014 Northern Colorado Bears football team represented the University of Northern Colorado in the 2014 NCAA Division I FCS football season. They were led by fourth-year head coach Earnest Collins Jr. and played their home games at Nottingham Field. They were a member of the Big Sky Conference. They finished the season 3–8, 2–6 in Big Sky play to finish in a three-way tie for tenth place.

Schedule

Source: Schedule

Game summaries

@ UNLV

Houston Baptist

@ Northern Iowa

@ Montana

Northern Arizona

Sacramento State

@ Eastern Washington

Idaho State

@ UC Davis

@ Weber State

North Dakota

References

Northern Colorado
Northern Colorado Bears football seasons
Northern Colorado Bears football